Sparkhill Library is a library located in Sparkhill.
The Library falls under the jurisdiction of Birmingham City Council. The building was originally erected as Yardley Council House in 1900 to house  Yardley Rural District Council.  Architect Arthur Harrison was engaged on the project from 1898 to 1902.

In 2014 the building was saved from being sold on the open market after local councillors made a plea for it to be offered for community use first.

Sparkhill Police Station, which includes the West Midlands Police Museum is next door. Also next door to the library is the Sparkhill Pool which houses a swimming pool alongside several other facilities.

The large building currently houses a social/cultural centre in which events or daily lessons are held; however in more recent years a neighbourhood office that was once situated within the building has closed.

The library opened to the public in 1987.

References 

Libraries in Birmingham, West Midlands
Library
Clock towers in the United Kingdom
Individual clocks in England